Jerry Powell (10 July 1852 – 3 September 1913) was an Australian cricketer. He played fifteen first-class matches for New South Wales between 1872/73 and 1884/85.

See also
 List of New South Wales representative cricketers

References

External links
 

1852 births
1913 deaths
Australian cricketers
New South Wales cricketers